Al Arabi Handball Team is the handball team of Al Arabi SC, based in the capital city of Doha, Qatar. It currently competes in the Qatar Handball League (QHL).

Honours
Qatar Handball League: 1982–83, 2019–20

External links
 Official website 

Qatari handball clubs
1952 establishments in Qatar
Handball clubs established in 1952
Sports clubs in Doha